Live at Fat Tuesday's is a live album by trumpeter Freddie Hubbard recorded in December 1991 and released on the MusicMasters label. It features performances by Hubbard, Javon Jackson, Benny Green, Christian McBride and Tony Reedus.

Reception
The Allmusic review by Scott Yanow states "Freddie Hubbard's once beautiful tone was definitely on the decline by this point, which is particularly noticeable on high notes (which often sound painful) and the lone ballad...Better to pick up Freddie Hubbard's earlier sessions instead"

Track listing
All compositions by Freddie Hubbard except as indicated
DISC 1
 "Take It to the Ozone" - 9:40  
 "Egad" (McBride) - 13:01  
 "Phoebe's Samba" (Green) - 6:56  
 "But Beautiful" (Johnny Burke, Jimmy Van Heusen) - 9:20  
 "One of a Kind" - 7:58
DISC 2  
 "Core" - 13:58  
 "Destiny's Children" - 19:30  
 "First Light" - 19:45

Personnel
Freddie Hubbard - trumpet
Javon Jackson - tenor saxophone
Benny Green - piano
Christian McBride - bass 
Tony Reedus - drums

References

1992 live albums
Freddie Hubbard live albums
MusicMasters Records live albums